Hyllievång is a neighbourhood of Malmö in Sweden, situated in Väster, Malmö Municipality.

References

Neighbourhoods of Malmö